Dover Township is an inactive township in Lafayette County, in the U.S. state of Missouri.

Dover Township was established in 1836, and most likely took its name from a local church of the same name.

References

Townships in Missouri
Townships in Lafayette County, Missouri